Aristides Zografakis (1 March 1912 – unknown) was a Greek chess player.

Biography
In the 1950s Aristides Zografakis was one of Greek leading chess players.

Aristides Zografakis played for Greece in the Chess Olympiads:
 In 1950, at third board in the 9th Chess Olympiad in Dubrovnik (+3, =1, -8),
 In 1952, at second reserve board in the 10th Chess Olympiad in Helsinki (+0, =4, -3),
 In 1958, at second reserve board in the 13th Chess Olympiad in Munich (+5, =3, -2).

References

External links

Aristides Zografakis chess games at 365chess.com

1912 births
Year of death missing
Greek chess players
Chess Olympiad competitors
20th-century Greek people